Eois carnana is a moth in the family Geometridae first described by Herbert Druce in 1892. It is found in Guatemala and Brazil.

Subspecies
Eois carnana carnana (Guatemala)
Eois carnana aberrans Prout, 1922 (Brazil)

References

Moths described in 1892
Eois
Moths of Central America
Moths of South America